Tazehabad-e Gardel Gari (also Romanized as Tāzehābād-e Gardel Gārī; also known as Tāzehābād) is a village in Ozgoleh Rural District, Ozgoleh District, Salas-e Babajani County, Kermanshah Province, Iran. At the 2006 census, its population was 75, in 17 families.

References 

Populated places in Salas-e Babajani County